Chlorestes is a genus of hummingbirds.

Species
The genus contains five species:
White-bellied emerald, Chlorestes candida (formerly placed in Amazilia)
Blue-throated sapphire, Chlorestes eliciae (formerly placed in Hylocharis)
White-chinned sapphire, Chlorestes cyanus (formerly placed in Hylocharis)
Violet-bellied hummingbird, Chlorestes julie (formerly placed in Juliamyia)
Blue-chinned sapphire, Chlorestes notata

This genus formerly included only the blue-chinned sapphire. Additional species were moved to this genus based on a molecular phylogenetic study of the hummingbirds published in 2014.

References

Chlorestes 
Bird genera